Mohawk Airlines was a regional passenger airline operating in the Mid-Atlantic region of the United States, mainly in New York and Pennsylvania, from the mid-1940s until its acquisition by Allegheny Airlines in 1972. At its height, it employed over 2,200 personnel and pioneered several aspects of regional airline operations, including being the first airline in the United States to hire an African American flight attendant in 1958. The airline was based at Ithaca Municipal Airport near Ithaca, New York, until 1958, when it moved to Oneida County Airport in Whitestown, New York.

History
The airline was founded in 1945 as Robinson Airlines by aerial photographer C. S. Robinson as a unit of Robinson Aviation, completing its first passenger flight on 6 April. The operation was based out of Ithaca Municipal Airport near Ithaca, New York, flying single-engine, three-passenger Fairchild F-24s. After the end of World War II, the Fairchilds were supplemented with two Cessna T-50s, and in 1946, the entire fleet was replaced with Beechcraft Model 18s.

To keep the airline flying, Robinson secured investments from a variety of local sources, notably Ithaca Enterprises, a nonprofit organization responsible for bringing new businesses to Ithaca, and the Cooperative Grange League Federation Exchange (now part of Agway), a farmers cooperative that had been organized by members of The Grange, and Cornell University. Most significant was the involvement of Edwin Albert Link, creator of the Link Trainer. Link lent the airline $75,000 to purchase three used Douglas DC-3s— but also removed control of the company from Robinson, making pilot Robert Peach its general manager. In 1948, the Civil Aeronautics Board certified the airline as a local service carrier, awarding a variety of routes in the Mohawk Valley region. The airline adopted the slogan Route of the Air Chiefs, and painted a blue and red "air chief" on the tails of its planes.

In 1952 Robert Peach purchased a controlling share of the airline, and Robinson removed himself from day-to-day operations. The board adopted the name Mohawk Airlines; in 1953 it carried 2 million passengers between 15 airports and had revenue of $24.3 million. The following summer it experimented briefly with helicopter service, connecting Newark, New Jersey, and Grossinger's Resort in the Catskill Mountains with a Sikorsky S-55. (The July 1954 OAG shows 13 flights a week each way between Newark and Liberty Airport ; fare $18 one way plus tax.) More successfully, the airline introduced Convair 240s on 1 July 1955, becoming the first local service carrier with pressurized aircraft. In 1956, having outgrown its facilities in Ithaca, it moved its corporate offices to Utica.

When hired by Mohawk Airlines in December 1957, Ruth Carol Taylor became the first African-American flight attendant in the United States. Six months after breaking one historic barrier, Ruth Taylor's career ended due to another barrier: the airline's marriage ban, a common practice among airlines of the day. Airlines often dismissed flight attendants who married or became pregnant.

Mohawk's golden age was the late 1950s and early 1960s; it acquired the Convair 440 in 1958, and Martin 4-0-4s in 1960. In 1961, Mohawk was the first airline to use a centralized computer-based reservation service, and in 1965, the first regional airline to use flight simulators. Mohawk upgraded its fleet with the BAC One-Eleven in 1965, becoming the first regional airline to fly jets.

The last DC-3 flights were in 1962; Mohawk ended Convair piston flights in 1969 and mainly flew the BAC One-Eleven and the Fairchild Hiller FH-227 turboprop. Like other local service airlines, Mohawk was subsidized; in 1962 operating "revenues" totaled $23.3 million including $4.6 million "federal subsidy".

In May 1968, Mohawk served 38 airports, from Boston and Washington, D.C. to Detroit. Between 1968 and 1971, labor and economic issues bled Mohawk financially. Unable to pay creditors at the end of that period, Mohawk began merger discussions with Allegheny Airlines, and merged into Allegheny on 12 April 1972. Allegheny changed its name to USAir in 1979, and later to US Airways. Following bankruptcies and a later merger with America West Airlines in 2005, US Airways purchased American Airlines in 2015 and assumed operations under the American Airlines name and logo.

Destinations
 Connecticut
 Hartford (Bradley International Airport)
 Illinois
 Chicago (Chicago Midway Airport)
 Massachusetts
 Bedford (Hanscom Field)*
 Boston (Logan International Airport)
 Martha's Vineyard (Martha's Vineyard Airport)
 Nantucket (Nantucket Memorial Airport)
 Worcester (Worcester Regional Airport)
 Michigan
 Detroit (Detroit Metropolitan Wayne County Airport)
 Minnesota
 Minneapolis-St. Paul (Minneapolis-St. Paul International Airport)

 New Hampshire
 Keene (Dillant–Hopkins Airport)*
 Lebanon (Lebanon Municipal Airport)
 Manchester (Grenier Field)
 New Jersey
 Atlantic City (Atlantic City International Airport)
 Newark (Newark Liberty International Airport)
 New York
 Albany (Albany International Airport)
 Alexandria Bay (Maxson Airfield)*
 Binghamton (Greater Binghamton Airport)
 Buffalo (Buffalo Niagara International Airport)
 Elmira/Corning (Elmira-Corning Regional Airport)
 Glens Falls (Floyd Bennett Memorial Airport)*
 Islip (Long Island MacArthur Airport)
 Ithaca/Cortland (Ithaca Tompkins International Airport)
 Jamestown (Chautauqua County-Jamestown Airport)
 Massena (Massena International Airport)
 New York (John F. Kennedy International Airport)
 Oneonta/Cooperstown (Oneonta Municipal Airport)*
 Plattsburgh (Clinton County Airport)
 Poughkeepsie (Dutchess County Airport)*
 Rochester (Greater Rochester International Airport)
 Utica/Rome (Oneida County Airport)*
 Saranac Lake (Adirondack Regional Airport)
 Syracuse (Syracuse Hancock International Airport)
 Watertown (Watertown International Airport)
 White Plains (Westchester County Airport)

 Ohio
 Cleveland (Cleveland Hopkins International Airport)
 Ontario, Canada
 Toronto (Toronto Pearson International Airport)
 Pennsylvania
 Erie (Erie International Airport)
 Philadelphia (Philadelphia International Airport)
 Pittsburgh (Pittsburgh International Airport)

 Quebec, Canada
 Montreal (Montréal–Dorval International Airport)
 Rhode Island
 Providence (T. F. Green Airport)
 Vermont
 Burlington (Burlington International Airport)
 Rutland (Rutland State Airport)
 Virginia
 Arlington (Ronald Reagan Washington National Airport)

Airports marked with an asterisk (*) are not now served by any scheduled airline.

Fleet

From top to bottom:
 Douglas DC-3 (in Robinson Airlines livery)
 Douglas DC-3 (in Mohawk Airlines livery)
 Convair 240
 Martin 4-0-4
 Convair 440
 BAC One-Eleven (initial livery)
 Fairchild Hiller FH-227B
 Boeing 727-200 (ordered but never delivered or operated)
 BAC One-Eleven (in final livery before Allegheny Airlines acquisition)

Historical fleet

Accidents and incidents
2 July 1963At Rochester, New York, Mohawk Airlines Flight 121 (a Martin 4-0-4) attempted to take off into a thunderstorm. Its wing-tip hit the ground and the aircraft cartwheeled; 7 died, 36 were injured.

23 June 1967Mohawk Airlines Flight 40 (a BAC 1-11) flying from Elmira, New York, to Washington, D.C., suffered a fire in the rear of the aircraft that destroyed the vertical tail, causing all loss of pitch control. The cause was a non-return valve failure in the APU unit, resulting in hydraulic fluid igniting. The aircraft crashed near Blossburg, Pennsylvania; all 34 people on board died.

19 November 1969Mohawk Airlines Flight 411 (a Fairchild-Hiller FH-227B) crashed into Pilot Knob on the east shore of Lake George, New York, on approach to Warren County Airport, Glens Falls, New York; all 14 on board died.

26 January 1972 Mohawk Airlines Flight 452 from Albany to LaGuardia Airport in New York City was hijacked and diverted to Westchester County Airport. The hijacker permitted the 42 passengers aboard to disembark there while he negotiated his demand for $200,000 cash. After several hours on the ground with the hijacker holding a flight attendant at gunpoint, Mohawk met his demands and the crew then flew the FH-227 airplane with the hijacker to Dutchess County Airport, landing after 3 a.m. As the 45-year old hijacker attempted to flee the airport in a getaway car, he was killed instantly by a shotgun blast from an FBI agent.

3 March 1972Mohawk Airlines Flight 405 (another FH-227) crashed into a house in Albany, New York, on approach to Albany County Airport. The crew had difficulty getting the cruise lock to disengage in one of the engines. While the crew attempted to deal with the problem, the aircraft crashed short of the airfield; 16 of the 48 people in the aircraft, and one person on the ground, died. The lone surviving crew member was a stewardess, Sandra Quinn.

In popular culture

In music
On Chicago's album, Chicago III (1971), the group recorded the song "Flight 602." Later that year, on the live album, Chicago at Carnegie Hall, the group announced that the title referred to a Mohawk flight from New York to Toronto.
The photo on the back cover of the supergroup, the Traveling Wilburys', first album, Traveling Wilburys Vol. 1 (1988), depicts five guitar cases with old-fashioned travel stickers. At the bottom of the guitar case on the right is a travel sticker that says "Fly Mohawk."

In television
During the eighth season of Bewitched, in season 8, episode 12, "The Eight Year Itch Witch" (1971), a woman telephones Darrin's Albany hotel room posing as a Mohawk Airlines reservation agent and tells him the 11 o'clock flight is cancelled because of fog.
Mohawk has been a recurring plot point in the AMC series Mad Men. In season 2, episode 1, "For Those Who Think Young" (2008) the fictional Sterling Cooper ad agency worked on a campaign for Mohawk Airlines. In season 2, episode 2, "Flight 1" (2008), Sterling Cooper resigns the account in order to pursue an account with American Airlines, which is considering changing agencies in the aftermath of the crash of American Airlines Flight 1 in New York. Mohawk Airlines returns to the agency in season 5, episode 3, "Tea Leaves" (2012) and in season 6/episode 7, "Man With a Plan".
In the animated sitcom F is for Family, taking place in the early 1970s, the principal character, Frank, works for a parody of the airline, called Mohican Airways.

See also 
 List of defunct airlines of the United States

Notes

References

External links
 

Airlines established in 1945
Airlines disestablished in 1972
Companies based in Oneida County, New York
Defunct airlines of the United States
Defunct companies based in New York (state)
Ithaca, New York
US Airways Group
Utica, New York
1945 establishments in New York (state)
American companies established in 1945
Defunct regional airlines of the United States